The Potato Control Law (1929) was based upon an economic policy enacted by U.S. President Herbert Hoover's Federal Emergency Relief Administration at the beginning of the Great Depression. The policy became a formal act in 1935, and its legislative sponsors were from the state of North Carolina. Hoover's presidential successor, Franklin D. Roosevelt, signed the Act into law on August 24, 1935.

The law was enforced by the Agricultural Adjustment Administration (AAA) to protect about 30,000 farmers who made their main living growing potatoes, and who feared that the potato market would be glutted by other farmers whose land had been legislatively idled by other AAA controls.

The law restricted the export of potatoes and mandated that they be used instead to provide direct relief to those in need. Because of the federal government's direct involvement in the economic affairs of American potato growers, this law was widely regarded as one of the most radical and controversial pieces of legislation enacted during the New Deal. The United States Supreme Court declared it unconstitutional in 1936.

The Potato Control legislation prevented individuals and companies from buying or offering to buy potatoes which were not packed in closed containers approved by the Secretary of Agriculture and bearing official government stamps. Penalties included a $1,000 fine on the first offense, and a year in jail and an additional $1,000 fine for a second offense. Farmers and brokers would not be issued the official stamps unless they paid a tax of $0.45 per bushel, or if they received tax-exemption stamps from the Secretary of Agriculture.

The law sparked considerable protest, as evident in the following 1935 declaration signed by citizens of West Amwell Township, New Jersey: That we protest against and declare that we will not be bound by the 'Potato Control Law,' an unconstitutional measure recently enacted by the United States Congress. We shall produce on our own land such potatoes as we may wish to produce and will dispose of them in such manner as we may deem proper. Included in the 1935 Potato Control Act was a provision that created the Federal Surplus Relief Corporation, a forerunner to The Emergency Food Assistance Program (TEFAP), which provides commodity food items like potatoes to soup kitchens, homeless shelters, and similar organizations that serve meals to the homeless and other individuals in need.

See also
 Agricultural Adjustment Act Amendment of 1935
 Critics of the New Deal
 New Deal
 Great Depression
 New Deal coalition

References

External links
 

1929 in American law
History of the potato
New Deal legislation
United States federal agriculture legislation

es:Ley de Ajuste Agrario
nl:Agricultural Adjustment Administration
ja:農業調整法
pt:Agricultural Adjustment Administration